The Never Ending Tour is the popular name for Bob Dylan's endless touring schedule since June 7, 1988. The 2013 tour marked the Never Ending Tour's 25th Anniversary.

Background
On December 3, 2012 it was stated in Isis Magazine that Dylan will be touring Asia in the Spring of 2013 with negotiations for venues being finalised. It is rumoured that the tour has been moved to the summer of 2013 alongside dates in Australia including an appearance at the Splendour in the Grass festival in Byron Bay, New South Wales and a concert at the Sydney Opera House. However, on February 25, 2013 one concert in California, Pennsylvania was leaked at Ticketmaster.

Thirteen dates for the first leg, in North America, were announced at Dylan's official website on February 27, 2013 beginning on April 5 in Buffalo, New York and currently ending in Saint Augustine, Florida on May. More concerts in the South Eastern States were added a week later.

A summer tour of the US was announced in April 2013 called the Americanarama Festival of Music. The tour comprises 26 shows beginning on June 26 in West Palm Beach, Florida and ending on August 4 in Mountain View, California.

Dylan's official website announced a European tour taking place between October and November on June 13, 2013. The tour included nine concerts in the UK, three concerts each in Glasgow, Blackpool and London. The London concerts took place at the Royal Albert Hall, where Dylan hadn't performed since May 27, 1966.

Reception
The first leg of the tour was met with a very good reception by fans and critics alike. In Akron, Ohio one critic claimed "The performance enthralled the capacity crowd." In Ithaca Zachary Zahos said "Seeing him move about, listening to what he's doing and witnessing how he continues to make himself relevant at 71 years young – How's that for inspiration." In Bethlehem, Pennsylvania "Bob Dylan didn't utter a single word to the audience; he knew the music would tell them everything they needed to know." And in California, Pennsylvania "Bob Dylan played with renewed vigour and the centerpiece was a jangly and textured version of 'Visions of Johanna' that was a slice of heaven."

Opening acts
Dawes: Spring 2013 (except April 27 & 28) 
The Wild Feathers: April 27 & 28 2013
Bob Weir: June 26 – 30
Wilco: June 26 – August 4
My Morning Jacket: June 26 – August 4 (except July 27)
Richard Thompson Electric Trio: July 2 – July 15
Ryan Bingham: July 18 – August 4
Garth Hudson (with Wilco): July 21
Beck: July 27

Set list
This set list is representative of the performance on November 28, 2013 in London, England. It does not represent all concerts for the duration of the tour.

"Things Have Changed"
"She Belongs to Me"
"Beyond Here Lies Nothin'"
"What Good Am I?"
"Duquesne Whistle"
"Waiting for You"
"Pay in Blood"
"Tangled Up in Blue"
"Love Sick"

"High Water (For Charley Patton)"
"Simple Twist of Fate"
"Early Roman Kings"
"Forgetful Heart"
"Spirit on the Water"
"Scarlet Town"
"Soon After Midnight"
"Long and Wasted Years"

"All Along the Watchtower"
"Blowin' in the Wind"

Tour dates

Cancellations and rescheduled shows

Personnel
Bob Dylan — Piano, Harmonica, Vocals
Tony Garnier — Bass guitar
Stu Kimball — Acoustic guitar, Electric guitar
George G. Receli — Drums, Percussion
Duke Robillard — Lead guitar (April 5 – June 30)
Charlie Sexton — Lead guitar (July 2–14, 26 & 27, 31, October 10 – present)
Colin Linden — Lead guitar (July 15–24, 28, August 1–4)

References

External links
BobLinks – Comprehensive log of concerts and set lists
BobDylan.com – Bob Dylan's Official Website Tour Page
Bjorner's Still on the Road – Information on recording sessions and performances

Bob Dylan concert tours
2013 concert tours